Elisha Marshall Pease (January 3, 1812 – August 26, 1883) was a Texas politician. He served as the fifth and 13th governor of Texas.

Texas Republic
A native of Enfield, Connecticut, Pease moved to Mexican Texas in 1835. He soon became active in the Texas independence movement and after the Texas Revolution began, Pease became the secretary of the provisional government. He served as the assistant secretary at the Convention of 1836 but was not an elected delegate to the Convention. After independence had been won, Pease was named the comptroller of public accounts in the government of the new but temporary Republic of Texas.

Texas State
Following the annexation of Texas to the United States, Pease was elected to the Texas House of Representatives in 1845 and reelected in 1847. In 1849, he ran for the Texas Senate from District 11 (Brazoria and Galveston counties) but lost to John B. Jones who was sworn in on November 5, 1849. Pease contested the election, was declared the winner, and was sworn in four days later on November 9, 1849.

Pease first ran for governor in 1851 but withdrew from the race two weeks before the election. He was elected in each of the next two elections, 1853 and 1855. As governor, he paid off the state debt and established the financial foundation that the state would later use to finance its schools and colleges.

In 1856, surveyor Jacob de Córdova of the Galveston, Houston, and Henderson Railroad Company named a newly discovered river in West Texas the "Pease River" after the governor.

Civil War and aftermath
During the American Civil War, Pease sided with the Union. He nonetheless enslaved several people; census records show ten enslaved people living and laboring at Pease's Austin plantation in 1860. After the war, he became a leader in the state Republican Party and was appointed as the civilian governor of Texas in 1867 by General Philip H. Sheridan, who was the military head of the Reconstruction government. Pease's policies as governor alienated both ex-Unionists and ex-Confederates and he resigned in 1869.

Elisha and his wife donated land to the City of Austin that would eventually become Pease Park.

Pease died of apoplexy in Lampasas, Texas. He was buried in Oakwood Cemetery in Austin, Texas.

Notes

References

 Griffin, Roger, "He was made of turkey." (Ph.D. dissertation, University of Texas at Austin, 1973).

External links

 Entry for Elisha M. Pease from the Biographical Encyclopedia of Texas published 1880, hosted by the Portal to Texas History.

1812 births
1883 deaths
People from Enfield, Connecticut
Texas Unionists
People of the Texas Revolution
Republican Party governors of Texas
Republican Party Texas state senators
People from Austin, Texas
People of Texas in the American Civil War
Burials at Oakwood Cemetery (Austin, Texas)
Unionist Party state governors of the United States
19th-century American politicians